Sindbad is a crater in the northern hemisphere of Saturn's moon Enceladus.  Sindbad was first seen in Voyager 2 images, though the southern rim has been seen by Cassini.  It is located at 67° North Latitude, 212° West Longitude and is 29.1 kilometers across.  A large, dome-like structure occupies the interior of the crater, suggesting the crater has undergone significant viscous relaxation.

Sindbad is named after a character from Arabian Nights.  The stories of his seven voyages make up a number of tales in Arabian Nights.

References

External links
Sindbad (Se-1) at  PIA12783: The Enceladus Atlas

Impact craters on Enceladus